André Francisco Moritz (born 6 August 1986) is a Brazilian professional footballer of who last played as an attacking midfielder for Singapore Premier League club Hougang United.

Career 
Moritz began his career with Avaí FC's youth categories, signing a professional contract with SC Internacional in 2003, aged 16. He was assigned to the academy and was top goal scorer in most of the Youth tournaments. He was promoted to first team in 2006, playing some matches in State League.

Due to limited chances, Moritz signed a contract with Fluminense FC. He helped the club to avoid relegation in the last game of the season, and also to win the 2007 Copa do Brasil. Moritz left Flu and signed a contract with Turkish club Kasımpaşa, in 2007. After three full seasons in Kasımpaşa, he signed a three-year contract with Kayserispor. And signed a two-year contract with Mersin in 2011 summer.

Moritz then went on trial at Rangers in Scotland. On 15 August 2012, his trial period at Rangers came to and end. Moritz said "My time with Rangers has come to an end, I enjoyed it but it was not meant to be... Talking with English clubs..."

On 24 August, he signed a one-year contract with Crystal Palace.
On 6 November 2012, he scored his first goal for Crystal Palace in the 5–0 victory over Ipswich Town, in Ian Holloway's first game in charge. In his next match, he scored the equaliser for Crystal Palace in a 2–1 win against Peterborough united on 10 November 2012, continuing his goalscoring run, before finding the net again on 17 November 2012 with a volley against Derby County – his third goal in three games. He then went on to score two free kicks against Wolverhampton Wanderers on 1 January 2013, receiving praise from Crystal Palace manager Ian Holloway.

Moritz joined Bolton Wanderers on a one-year deal on 1 August 2013. On 9 November, Moritz scored his first goal for Bolton Wanderers against Millwall in a 3–1 victory. In July 2014, Bolton confirmed that at the expiration of his contract, Moritz had left the club.

In September 2014, South Korean Club, Pohang Steelers announced that Moritz joined the club on a two-year contract which began on 1 January 2015.

On 10 October 2014, it was announced that Moritz will play for Mumbai City FC in the inaugural Indian Super League. On 18 October, Moritz scored his first goal for the club en route to the league's first ever hat-trick in a 5–0 win over FC Pune City at the DY Patil Stadium.

In July 2015, Moritz agreed to return to Mumbai City for the 2015 season, but after only one game in October, Moritz returned to parent club Pohang Steelers.

On 6 December 2015, Moritz joined Buriram United in Thai Premier League for the 2016 season. On 3 January 2018, he signed with Brazilian second tier Avaí Futebol Clube after a stint with Turkish club Denizlispor. 

Moritz has signed up with Hougang United Football Club in Singapore for the 2022 season of the Singapore Premier League. On 11 March 2022, Moritz scored his first two goals for Hougang, his second goal a 45-yard screamer from the centre line to give Hougang a 3–2 victory against Geylang International.

Personal life
Moritz has got a two tattoos on his right elbow as one dedicated to his parents and one is an iconographic symbol of Star and crescent. Moritz learned to speak Turkish during his spells in Turkey. In 2010, he expressed that he would be delighted to play for the Turkey national team.

Honours 
Fluminense
 Copa do Brasil: 2007

Crystal Palace
 Football League Championship play-offs: 2012–13

Buriram United
 Toyota Premier Cup: 2016
 Kor Royal Cup: 2016Avaí Campeonato Catarinense: 2019Hougang United'''
Singapore Cup: 2022

References

External links 
 
 
 
 

1986 births
Living people
Brazilian footballers
Sportspeople from Florianópolis
Sport Club Internacional players
Fluminense FC players
Andre Moritz
Kasımpaşa S.K. footballers
Crystal Palace F.C. players
Bolton Wanderers F.C. players
Kayserispor footballers
Denizlispor footballers
Mersin İdman Yurdu footballers
Avaí FC players
Mumbai City FC players
Pohang Steelers players
Londrina Esporte Clube players
Campeonato Brasileiro Série B players
Süper Lig players
TFF First League players
K League 1 players
Indian Super League players
English Football League players
Brazilian expatriate footballers
Brazilian expatriate sportspeople in Turkey
Expatriate footballers in Turkey
Brazilian expatriate sportspeople in England
Expatriate footballers in England
Expatriate footballers in India
Brazilian expatriate sportspeople in India
Expatriate footballers in South Korea
Brazilian expatriate sportspeople in South Korea
Expatriate footballers in Thailand
Brazilian expatriate sportspeople in Thailand
Association football midfielders
Brazilian people of German descent